István Pauli or István Pável ( July 13, 1760 – January 29, 1829) was a Hungarian Slovene Roman Catholic priest. Pauli was the teacher of Pertoča György Kousz who was the author of a hymnal in Pertoča.

He was born in Beltinci. His parents were Márk Pável and Katalin Gyrék. In Bratislava, he studied theology, and in 1789 he was ordained. From 1790-1797, he was the priest of Pertoča. On October 1, 1822, he retired to Szombathely and died there sometime later.

See also 
 List of Slovene writers and poets in Hungary

Sources 
 Vis. Can. Perestó, 1808. máj. 8.
 Vilko Novak: Martjanska pesmarica, ZALOŽBA ZRC. Ljubljana 1997. 

Slovenian writers and poets in Hungary
19th-century Slovenian Roman Catholic priests
1760 births
1829 deaths
People from Beltinci
18th-century Slovenian Roman Catholic priests